Scelolyperus is a genus of skeletonizing leaf beetles in the family Chrysomelidae. There are more than 20 described species in Scelolyperus. They are found in North America, Mexico, and the Palaearctic.

Species
These 28 species belong to the genus Scelolyperus:

 Scelolyperus bimarginatus (Blake, 1928)
 Scelolyperus carinatus Wilcox, 1965
 Scelolyperus clarki Gilbert & Andrews
 Scelolyperus curvipes Wilcox, 1965
 Scelolyperus cyanellus (J. L. LeConte, 1865)
 Scelolyperus flavicollis (J. L. LeConte, 1859)
 Scelolyperus graptoderoides (Crotch, 1874)
 Scelolyperus hatchi Wilcox, 1965
 Scelolyperus laticeps (Horn, 1893)
 Scelolyperus lecontii (Crotch, 1873)
 Scelolyperus lemhii Hatch, 1971
 Scelolyperus liriophilus Wilcox, 1965
 Scelolyperus loripes Horn, 1893
 Scelolyperus megalurus Wilcox, 1965
 Scelolyperus meracus (Say, 1826)
 Scelolyperus nigrocyaneus (J. L. LeConte, 1879)
 Scelolyperus pasadenae S. Clark, 1996
 Scelolyperus phenacus Wilcox, 1965
 Scelolyperus phoxus Wilcox, 1965
 Scelolyperus ratulus Wilcox, 1965
 Scelolyperus schwarzii Horn, 1893
 Scelolyperus smaragdinus (J. L. LeConte, 1859)
 Scelolyperus tejonicus Crotch, 1874
 Scelolyperus tetonensis S. Clark, 1996
 Scelolyperus torquatus (J. L. LeConte, 1884)
 Scelolyperus transitus (Horn, 1893)
 Scelolyperus varipes (J. L. LeConte, 1857)
 Scelolyperus wilcoxi Hatch, 1971

References

Further reading

 
 
 
 

Galerucinae
Articles created by Qbugbot
Chrysomelidae genera
Taxa named by George Robert Crotch